Lake Grace North, part of the Lake Grace System, is a wetland located in the Great Southern region of Western Australia. Situated in the Shire of Lake Grace, the lake is part of the Western Mallee subregion of the Mallee region of the South West Botanic Province. It is one of four lakes in the area comprising a DIWA-listed wetland of national importance.

See also

 List of lakes of Western Australia

References

Grace North, Lake
DIWA-listed wetlands
Great Southern (Western Australia)